Kalaupapa National Historical Park is a United States National Historical Park located in Kalaupapa, Hawaii, on the island of Molokai. Coterminous with the boundaries of Kalawao County and primarily on Kalaupapa peninsula, it was established by Congress in 1980 to expand upon the earlier National Historic Landmark site of the Kalaupapa Leper Settlement. It is administered by the National Park Service. Its goal is to preserve the cultural and physical settings of the two leper colonies on the island of Molokai, which operated from 1866 to 1969 and had a total of 8500 residents over the decades.

More than 7300 people live on the remainder of the island, which was a site of cattle ranching and pineapple production for decades. Much of these lands were purchased and controlled by the owners and developers of Molokai Ranch. This part of the island is also a tourist destination.

History of Kalaupapa peninsula 
Archeological evidence has revealed human habitation by indigenous peoples for more than 69 years before European contact. The peninsula has house sites, cultivated taro fields and irrigation systems, stone walls, and temples (heiau), all constructed by ancient residents. "Historical accounts from the early to mid-1800s speak of populations of 1,000 to 2,700 people living on the peninsula, in the valleys, and in the villages" but by 1853, there were only about 140 people remaining after epidemics of Eurasian diseases.

History of the Kalaupapa leprosy settlements (1865 – present)
In 1865 the Kingdom legislature passed a law to try to prevent transmission of leprosy, now known as Hansen's disease after the scientist who discovered the bacterium. The disease had been introduced to the islands about 1830 by foreign workers. At the time it was incurable. Sugar planters had brought pressure on the government as they were worried about the labor supply.

The government arranged for Native Hawaiian inhabitants to be removed from the Kalaupapa to prepare for its development as an isolation settlement for persons with severe leprosy. This cut off the island people's cultural ties and associations with the āina (land), which had been established for centuries.

Bringing patients to the isolation settlements, first at Kalawao and then at Kalaupapa, led to broader dislocations across Hawaiian society. In the long term many families were affected and some divided when a member contracted leprosy. The governments of the Kingdom, and subsequently, the Territory and State of Hawaii tried to control leprosy (also known as Hansen's disease), a much feared illness, by relocating patients with severe symptoms to the isolated peninsula. Other patients were treated in quarantine at facilities on the main islands; but families were still broken up in the process.

The first settlement was started on the windward side at Kalawao, followed by one at Kalaupapa. In 1890 a total of 1100 persons with leprosy were living here, the peak of resident population. In those years, they generally had to leave family behind on other islands. The effects of both the broken connections with the āina and of family members "lost" to Kalaupapa are still felt in Hawaii today.

The settlements were administered by the Board of Health, with local financial control held by Rudolph Meyer, a German immigrant who worked for the Molokaʻi Ranch and lived on the island. Local supervision for decades was by superintendents of Hawaiian and part-Hawaiian ancestry, some appointed from among the patients or family members with persons with leprosy.

Belgian missionary priests from the Congregation of the Sacred Hearts of Jesus and Mary were among those who cared for persons with leprosy on Molokai. The most well-known was Belgian-born Father Damien, who served there from 1873 to his death in 1889. For his charity he was canonized by the Roman Catholic Church as a saint in 2009, the 10th person recognized in what is now the United States. Among other missionaries and caregivers, was Mother Marianne Cope, a nun and administrator of St. Joseph's Hospital in Syracuse, New York. As the General Minister of the Sisters of St. Francis of Syracuse, she brought six sisters with her to the islands to aid in the care of persons with leprosy and develop the medical facilities. Mother Marianne and sisters of her community developed hospitals, homes and schools on the islands of Oʻahu and Maui from 1883 to 1888, at which time they traveled to Kalaupapa where she lived and worked there until her death in 1918. In 2012 she was canonized as a saint by the Catholic Church. Also serving in the colony was Brother Joseph Dutton, who went to Molokaʻi in 1886 to aid the dying Father Damien.

The Congregation of the Sacred Hearts continued to have brothers who devoted their lives to work on Molokaʻi and assist the residents. From the late 20th century, recent figures included Henri Systermans and Fr. Joseph Hendricks, whose death in November 2008 marked the end of this 140-year-old tradition.  Since St. Marianne arrived in 1888, sixty-five Sisters of St. Francis have maintained a continuous presence in the settlement. There are two Sisters currently residing at the Bishop Home, established by Mother Marianne in 1888 as the Charles R. Bishop Home for Unprotected Leper Girls and Women to care for those she deemed the most vulnerable of the population.

Hansen's disease, found in 1873 to be caused by a bacterium, has been curable since the 1940s with the use of modern antibiotics. There are no active cases of Hansen's disease among residents of the Kalaupapa settlement or on the island of Molokai. After the management of the settlement was turned over to the National Park Service, residents of the former colony were allowed to stay if they chose to do so. They and their descendant families who wish to continue to live in the neighborhood of housing maintained on the peninsula.

Representation in popular culture 
 After being given a high award by the Kingdom of Hawaii, Belgian missionary-priest Father Damien attracted considerable publicity to the leper colony in the late 19th century; his story was recounted in popular culture and literature.
 Robert Louis Stevenson, who suffered from tuberculosis, then also incurable, visited the Molokai leper colony after Father Damien's death in 1889. He was moved by Damien's care for patients and described the settlement as a "prison fortified by nature." 2000-foot-high mountains cut off the settlement from the rest of the island. He published a 6,000-word open letter praising Father Damien's work. Robert Louis Stevenson was inspired by Mother Marianne and the girls of the Bishop Home. He taught the girls croquet, sent a piano as a gift and wrote a poem to Mother Marianne and sisters. Both a letter about the girls and the poem are published in "The Life of Robert Louis Stevenson" by Graham Balfour.
 Jack London visited in 1908 and wrote the short stories, "Lepers of Molokai" and "Koolau the Leper" in response.
 James Michener's 1959 novel Hawaii describes life in the colony in the difficult early times.
 The 1999 movie Molokai, featuring Peter O'Toole and Kris Kristofferson, features the life of Father Damien and his work among persons with leprosy.
 Alan Brennert's 2003 novel Molokaʻi recounts some of the history of the Kalaupapa leprosy settlement through the eyes of fictional character, Rachel Kalama, exiled there at age 8
 Location for a Hawaii Five-0 investigation into a murder in the episode Kai Paʻani Nui (Season 7, Episode 15).

Park description 
Kalaupapa National Historical Park, established in 1980, preserves the physical settings of the historic Hansen's disease settlements of Kalawao and Kalaupapa. The community of Kalaupapa, on the leeward side of Kalaupapa Peninsula, is still home for a few elderly surviving former Hansen's disease patients. Some were disfigured by the disease before being cured and wanted to continue refuge here. They have shared their memories and experiences of their ordeals and of life on the island.

Surviving structures at Kalawao, on the windward side of the peninsula, are the Protestant church of Siloama, established in 1866, and Saint Philomena Catholic Church, which is associated with the work of St. Father Damien.

References

External links

 Kalaupapa National Historical Park, National Park Service
 "Hawaii leprosy settlement faces sainthood dilemma"
 Access to the park by mule
 Photos, history and visitor details
 

National Historical Parks of the United States
Parks in Hawaii
Geography of Kalawao County, Hawaii
Leper colonies
Leprosy in Hawaii
National Historic Landmarks in Hawaii
Protected areas of Molokai
Populated places established in 1866
1866 establishments in Hawaii
Protected areas established in 1980
1980 establishments in Hawaii
National Park Service areas in Hawaii
Historic American Engineering Record in Hawaii
Historic districts on the National Register of Historic Places in Hawaii
Medical and health organizations based in Hawaii
National Register of Historic Places in Kalawao County, Hawaii
Parks on the National Register of Historic Places in Hawaii
Hawaii Register of Historic Places